Cláudio Ulpiano Santos Nogueira Itagiba (14 November 1932 – 4 January 1999) was a Brazilian philosopher and expert on the work of Gilles Deleuze. He taught at the Universidade do Estado do Rio de Janeiro and Fluminense Federal University.

Bibliography
Do saber em Platão e do sentido nos estóicos como reversão do platonismo. Dissertação de Mestrado.
O Pensamento de Deleuze ou a Grande Aventura do Espírito . Tese de Doutorado.
Mundo Próprio - Primeiro Movimento

References

Link
www.claudioulpiano.org.br

Brazilian philosophers
1932 births
1999 deaths
Academic staff of the Rio de Janeiro State University
20th-century Brazilian philosophers